All the King's Horses may refer to:

 "All the king's horses and all the king's men", a line from the nursery rhyme Humpty Dumpty

It may also refer to:

Films and television
 All the King's Horses (film), a 1935 American comedy musical film
 "All the King's Horses" (Upstairs, Downstairs), an episode of the British drama series Upstairs, Downstairs
 All the King's Horses (Zack Snyder's Justice League), part 5 of the movie Zack Snyder's Justice League

Songs
"All the King's Horses" (The Firm song)
"All the King's Horses" (Lynn Anderson song), 1976
 "All the King's Horses", a song by Dusty Springfield from the 1969 album Dusty in Memphis
 "All the King's Horses (All the King's Men)", a song by Honey Cone from the 1971 album, Soulful Tapestry
 "All the King's Horses", a song by Aretha Franklin from the 1972 album Young, Gifted and Black
 "All the King's Horses", a song by Nazareth from the 1977 album Expect No Mercy
 "All the King's Horses", a song by The Nolans from the 1979 album The Nolan Sisters
 "All the King's Horses", a song by Petra from the 1987 album This Means War!
 "All the King's Horses", a song by The Monkees from the 1990 album Missing Links Volume Two
 "All the King's Horses", a song by Robert Plant and the Strange Sensation from the 2005 album Mighty ReArranger
 "All the King's Horses", a B-side to Blind Guardian's 2007 single "Another Stranger Me"
 "All the king's Horses", a soundtrack by Thomas Bergersen from the 2012 album SkyWorld
 "The Archer”, a song by Taylor Swift from the 2019 album Lover (album)
 "Ballroom Extravaganza", a song by DPR IAN from the 2022 album Moodswings in to Order

Albums
 All the King's Horses (Grover Washington, Jr. album), 1972
 All the King's Horses (The Legendary Pink Dots album), 2002 
 All the King's Horses (Lynn Anderson album), 1976

Literature
 "All the King's Horses" (short story), a 1953 short story by Kurt Vonnegut
 All the King's Horses, a novel by Jeffrey A. Nesbit
 All the King's Horses, a 1930 novel by Margaret Widdemer
 All the King's Horses, a 1960 novel by Michèle Bernstein
 All the King's Horses (play), a 1961 comedy play by John McDonnell

See also
 All the King's Men (disambiguation), for other articles based on the same verse